Swindon is a town in Wiltshire, England. At the 2021 Census the population of the town was 201,669, making it the largest settlement in the county. Located in South West England, Swindon lies between Bristol, 35 miles (56 kilometres) to its west, and Reading, equidistant to its east.

Recorded in the 1086 Domesday Book as Suindune, it was a small market town until the mid-19th century, when it was selected as the principal site for the Great Western Railway's repair and maintenance works, leading to a marked increase in its population. The new town constructed for the railway workers produced pioneering amenities such as the UK's first lending library and a 'cradle-to-grave' healthcare centre that was later used as a blueprint for the NHS.

After the Second World War, the town expanded dramatically again, as industry and people moved from London to designated New or Expanded Towns such as Swindon. One of the fastest growing towns in Europe during the second half of the 20th century, its economy diversified, attracting large international companies as the railway works declined and finally closed in the 1980s. 

Served by the M4 motorway and Great Western Main Line, today, Swindon has the head offices of organisations such as English Heritage, Intel, Nationwide, all of the National Research Councils, the National Trust, UK Space Agency, WHSmith, and Zurich Insurance Group. It also houses the Bodleian Library's Book Storage Facility, the Historic England Archive, and the Science Museum's National Collections.

The McArthurGlen Designer Outlet and STEAM Railway Museum are both housed in the renovated former railway works, with the currently closed Oasis Leisure Centre (claimed by some to be the inspiration for the name of the Manchester band), and infamous Magic Roundabout also notable points of interest. The Cotswolds lie just to the town's north and the North Wessex Downs to its south. Avebury, the largest megalithic stone circle in the world, is also nearby. 

The town has one professional football team, Swindon Town F.C., who play in League Two at the 15,000-seat County Ground in the town centre. Other teams in the town include the Swindon Wildcats Ice Hockey side and five-time British speedway champions the Swindon Robins.

History

Early history
The Anglo-Saxon settlement of Swindon sat in a defensible position atop a limestone hill. It is referred to in the 1086 Domesday Book as Suindune, believed to be derived from the Old English words "swine" and "dun" meaning "pig hill" or possibly Sweyn's hill, Sweyn being a Scandinavian name akin to Sven and English swain, meaning a young man.

Swindon is recorded in the Domesday Book as a manor in the hundred of Blagrove, Wiltshire. It was one of the larger manors, recorded as having 27 households and a rent value of £10 14s, which was divided among five landlords. Before the Battle of Hastings the Swindon estate was owned by an Anglo-Saxon thane called Leofgeat. After the Norman Conquest, Swindon was split into five holdings: the largest was held between Miles Crispin and Odin the Chamberlain, and the second by Wadard, a knight in the service of Odo of Bayeux, brother of the king. The manors of Westlecot, Walcot, Rodbourne, Moredon and Stratton are also listed; all are now part of Swindon.

The Goddard family were lord of the manor from the 16th century for many generations, living at the manor house, sometimes known as The Lawn.

Swindon was a small market town, mainly for barter trade, until roughly 1848. This original market area is on top of the hill in central Swindon, now known as Old Town.

The Industrial Revolution was responsible for an acceleration of Swindon's growth. Construction of the Wilts and Berks Canal in 1810 and the North Wilts Canal in 1819 brought trade to the area, and Swindon's population started to grow.

Railway town

Between 1841 and 1842, Isambard Kingdom Brunel's Swindon Works was built for the repair and maintenance of locomotives on the Great Western Railway (GWR).  The GWR built a small railway village to house some of its workers. The Steam Railway Museum and English Heritage, including the English Heritage Archive, now occupy part of the old works. In the village were the GWR Medical Fund Clinic at Park House and its hospital, both on Faringdon Road, and the 1892 health centre in Milton Road, which housed clinics, a pharmacy, laundries, baths, Turkish baths and swimming pools, was almost opposite.

From 1871, GWR workers had a small amount deducted from their weekly pay and put into a healthcare fund; GWR doctors could prescribe them or their family members medicines or send them for medical treatment. In 1878 the fund began providing artificial limbs made by craftsmen from the carriage and wagon works, and nine years later opened its first dental surgery. In his first few months in post, the dentist extracted more than 2,000 teeth. From the opening in 1892 of the health centre, a doctor could also prescribe a haircut or even a bath. The cradle-to-grave extent of this service was later used as a blueprint for the NHS.

The Mechanics' Institute, formed in 1844, moved into a building that looked rather like a church and included a covered market, on 1 May 1855. The New Swindon Improvement Company, a co-operative, raised the funds for this programme of self-improvement and paid the GWR £40 a year for its new home on a site at the heart of the railway village. It was a groundbreaking organisation that transformed the railway's workforce into some of the country's best-educated manual workers.

The Mechanics' Institute had the UK's first lending library, and a range of improving lectures, access to a theatre and various other activities, such as ambulance classes and xylophone lessons. A former institute secretary formed the New Swindon Co-operative Society in 1853 which, after a schism in the society's membership, spawned the New Swindon Industrial Society, which ran a retail business from a stall in the market at the institute. The institute also nurtured pioneering trades unionists and encouraged local democracy.

When tuberculosis hit the new town, the Mechanics' Institute persuaded the industrial pioneers of North Wiltshire to agree that the railway's former employees should continue to receive medical attention from the doctors of the GWR Medical Society Fund, which the institute had played a role in establishing and funding.

Swindon's 'other' railway, the Swindon, Marlborough and Andover Railway, merged with the Swindon and Cheltenham Extension Railway to form the Midland & South Western Junction Railway, which set out to join the London & South Western Railway with the Midland Railway at Cheltenham. The Swindon, Marlborough & Andover had planned to tunnel under the hill on which Swindon's Old Town stands but the money ran out and the railway ran into Swindon Town railway station, off Devizes Road in the Old Town, skirting the new town to the west, intersecting with the GWR at Rushey Platt and heading north for Cirencester, Cheltenham and the LMS, whose 'Midland Red' livery the M&SWJR adopted.

During the second half of the 19th century, Swindon New Town grew around the main line between London and Bristol. In 1900, the original market town, Old Swindon, merged with its new neighbour at the bottom of the hill to become a single town.

On 1 July 1923, the GWR took over the largely single-track M&SWJR and the line northwards from Swindon Town was diverted to Swindon Junction station, leaving the Town station with only the line south to Andover and Salisbury. The last passenger trains on what had been the SM&A ran on 10 September 1961, 80 years after the railway's first stretch opened.

During the first half of the 20th century, the railway works was the town's largest employer and one of the biggest in the country, employing more than 14,500 workers. Alfred Williams (1877–1930) wrote about his life as a hammerman at the works.

The works' decline started in 1960, when it rolled out Evening Star, the last steam engine to be built in the UK. The works lost its locomotive building role and took on rolling stock maintenance for British Rail. In the late 1970s, much of the works closed and the rest followed in 1986.

The community centre in the railway village was originally the barrack accommodation for railway employees of the GWR. The building became the Railway Museum in the 1960s, until the opening of the STEAM Museum in the 2000s.

Modern period

The Second World War saw an influx of new industries as part of the war effort; Vickers-Armstrong making aircraft at Stratton, and Plessey at Cheney Manor producing electrical components. By 1960, Plessey had become Swindon's biggest employer, with a predominantly female workforce.

David Murray John, Swindon's town clerk from 1938 to 1974, is seen as a pioneering figure in Swindon's post-war regeneration: his last act before retirement was to sign the contract for Swindon's tallest building, which is now named after him.  Murray John's successor was David Maxwell Kent, appointed by the Swindon/Highworth Joint Committee in 1973: he had worked closely with Murray John and continued similar policies for a further twenty years. The Greater London Council withdrew from the Town Development Agreement and the local council continued the development on its own.

There was the problem of the Western Development and of Lydiard Park being in the new North Wiltshire district, but this was resolved by a boundary change to take in part of North Wiltshire. Another factor limiting local decision-taking was the continuing role of Wiltshire County Council in the administration of Swindon. Together with like-minded councils, a campaign was launched to bring an updated form of county borough status to Swindon. This was successful in 1997 with the formation of Swindon Borough Council, covering the areas of the former Thamesdown and the former Highworth Rural District Council.

In February 2008, The Times named Swindon as one of "The 20 best places to buy a property in Britain". Only Warrington had a lower ratio of house prices to household income in 2007, with the average household income in Swindon among the highest in the country.

In October 2008, Swindon Council made a controversial move to ban fixed point speed cameras. The move was branded as reckless by some, but by November 2008 Portsmouth, Walsall, and Birmingham councils were also considering the move.

In 2001, construction began on Priory Vale, the third and final instalment in Swindon's 'Northern Expansion' project, which began with Abbey Meads and continued at St Andrew's Ridge. In 2002, the New Swindon Company was formed with the remit of regenerating the town centre, to improve Swindon's regional status. The main areas targeted were Union Square, The Promenade, The Hub, Swindon Central, North Star Village, The Campus, and the Public Realm.

In August 2019, a secondary school in the town was at the centre of a 'county lines' drug supply investigation by Wiltshire Police, with 40 pupils suspected of being involved in the supply of cannabis and cocaine, and girls as young as 14 being coerced into sexual activity in exchange for drugs.

Governance

The local council was created in 1974 as the Borough of Thamesdown, out of the areas of Swindon Borough and Highworth Rural District. It was not initially called Swindon, because the borough covers a larger area than the town; it was renamed as the Borough of Swindon in 1997. The borough became a unitary authority on 1 April 1997, following a review by the Local Government Commission for England. The town is therefore no longer under the auspices of Wiltshire Council.

The executive comprises a leader and a cabinet, currently made up from the Conservative Group. The council as of the 2016 election has a majority of Conservative councillors.

Swindon is represented in the national parliament by two MPs. Robert Buckland (Conservative) was elected for the South Swindon seat in May 2010 with a 5.5% swing from Labour and Justin Tomlinson, also Conservative, represents North Swindon after a 10.1% swing at the same election. Both retained their seats at the 2015 and 2017 elections. Prior to 1997 there was a single seat for Swindon, although much of what is now in Swindon was then part of the Devizes seat.

Geography

Swindon is within a landlocked county and is a considerable distance from any coastline. The nearest section of coast on the English Channel is near Christchurch,  due south.

The landscape is dominated by the chalk hills of the Wiltshire Downs to the south and east. The Old Town stands on a hill of Purbeck and Portland stone; this was quarried from Roman times until the 1950s. The area that was known as New Swindon is made up of mostly Kimmeridge clay with outcrops of Corrallian clay in the areas of Penhill and Pinehurst. Oxford clay makes up the rest of the borough. The River Ray rises at Wroughton and forms much of the borough's western boundary, joining the Thames which defines the northern boundary, and the source of which is located in nearby Kemble, Gloucestershire. The River Cole and its tributaries flow northeastward from the town and form the northeastern boundary.

 Nearby towns: Calne, Chippenham, Royal Wootton Bassett, Cirencester, Cricklade, Devizes, Highworth, Marlborough, Witney and Malmesbury
 Nearby villages: Badbury, Blunsdon, Broad Hinton, Chiseldon, Hook, Liddington, Lydiard Millicent, Lyneham, Minety, Purton, South Marston, Wanborough, Wroughton
 Nearby places of interest: Avebury, Barbury Castle, Crofton Pumping Station, Lydiard Country Park, Silbury Hill, Stonehenge, Uffington White Horse
 Sites of Special Scientific Interest in Swindon include Coate Water, Great Quarry, Haydon Meadow, Okus Quarry and Old Town Railway Cutting

Climate
Swindon has an oceanic climate (Cfb in the Köppen climate classification), like the vast majority of the British Isles, with cool winters and warm summers.

Sunshine, at 1,565 hours a year, is typical for inland parts of Southern England, although significantly higher than most areas further north.

Demographics 
The 2011 census recorded a population of 209,156 people in the Swindon unitary authority area (including the town's urban area, Highworth, and other nearby parishes), with a 50/50 balance of males and females. By mid-2019, the estimated population of the unitary authority area was 222,193.

As of 2011, 57.5% of Swindonians identify themselves as Christians, a reduction from 70% in 2001. This is followed by those of no religion (31%), Muslims (1.7%), Sikhs (0.6%), Hindus (1.2%), other (0.5%) and Judaism (0.1%).

In 2015, Public Health England found that 70.4% of the population was either overweight or obese with a BMI greater than 25.

In 2011, 16.7% of the population of Swindon were non-White British compared with 15.4% in the surrounding borough. There was also little difference between the percentages of Black and Asian residents. Swindon is one of the most ethnically diverse towns in South West England: 4.6% of the population registered themselves as 'Other White' and 2.5% of the population was either mixed race or of another ethnicity.

There are three definitions of the town of Swindon for statistical purposes. The most accurate and widely accepted is the Built Up Area Subdivision, which had a population of 182,441 in 2011. Another definition is the Built Up Area, with a slightly higher population of 185,609 which includes outlying areas not often referred to as being part of the town, such as Wanborough. The final definition is the unparished area, with a population of 122,642. As its name suggests it reflects the former unparished area, now covered by the parishes of West Swindon, Central Swindon North and South, and Nythe, Eldene and Liden; thus it omits suburbs to the east and north, namely the parishes of Covingham, Stratton St Margaret and Haydon Wick.

St Helena community
By 2018, Swindon had a concentration of people originating from Saint Helena.

Polish community
Around 1950, some settled in Scotland and others in Swindon rather than stay in the barracks or hostels they were offered.

The 2001 UK Census found that most of the Polish-born people had stayed or returned after serving with British forces during World War II. Swindon and Nottingham were parts of this settlement. Data from that census showed that 566 Swindonians were Polish-born. Notes to those data read: "The Polish Resettlement Act of 1947, which was designed to provide help and support to people who wished to settle here, covered about 190,000 people ... at the time Britain did not recognise many of the professional [qualifications] gained overseas ... [but] many did find work after the war; some went down the mines, some worked on the land or in steelworks. Housing was more of a problem and many Poles were forced to live in barracks previously used for POWs ... The first generation took pains to ensure that their children grew up with a strong sense of Polish identity".

NHS planners devising services for senior citizens estimated in 1994 that 5% of Swindon's population were not 'ethnically British', and most of those were culturally Polish.

The town's Polish ex-servicemen's club, which had run a football team for 45 years, closed in 2012. Barman Jerzy Trojan blamed the decline of both club and team on the children and grandchildren of the original refugees losing their Polish identity.

Places of worship

There are numerous places of worship in Swindon, some of which are listed buildings. Until 1845, the only church in Swindon was the Holy Rood Church, a Grade II listed building. That year, St Mark's Church was built. In 1851, Christ Church was built. Later in the year, the first Roman Catholic chapel was opened in the town and was also named Holy Rood. In 1866, Cambria Baptist Chapel was built. In the 1880s, Bath Road Methodist Chapel was built. In 1885, St Barnabas Church was built. In 1907, St Augustine's Church in Even Swindon was built. Various churches and places of worship were built in the town by other denominations and faiths. Pattern Church was launched on Christmas 2018, on the site of the former Pattern Store.

Economy

 Major employers in the town include BMW/Mini (formerly Pressed Steel Fisher) in Stratton, Dolby Labs, international engineering consultancy firm Halcrow, and retailer W H Smith's distribution centre and headquarters. Electronics company Intel, insurance and financial services companies such as Nationwide Building Society and Zurich Financial Services, the energy companies RWE Generation UK plc and Npower (a company of the Innogy group), the fuel card and fleet management company Arval, pharmaceutical companies such as Canada's Patheon and the United States-based Catalent Pharma Solutions and French medical supplies manufacturer Vygon (UK) have their UK divisions headquartered in the town. Swindon also has the head office of the National Trust and the head office of the UK Space Agency. Other employers include all of the national Research Councils, the British Computer Society, TE Connectivity and Lok'nStore. 

From 1985 to 2021, Japanese car manufacturer Honda had its sole UK plant at South Marston, just outside Swindon. In March 2021, it was announced that logistics firm Panattoni would move to the former Honda site. 

Swindon was for a time a centre of excellence for 3G and 4G mobile telecommunications research and development for Motorola, Alcatel, Lucent Technologies, Nokia Siemens Networks and Cisco.

Transport

Located at the junction of two Roman roads, the town has developed into a transport hub over the centuries. It is on the historical GWR and on canals. It also has two junctions (15 and 16) on the M4 motorway.

Swindon railway station opened in 1842 as Swindon Junction, and until 1895 every train stopped for at least 10 minutes to change locomotives. As a result, the station hosted the first recorded railway refreshment rooms.

Swindon bus operators are Swindon's Bus Company (formerly Thamesdown) and Stagecoach. The former Stagecoach Bus Depot on Eastcott Road has been approved for development as a housing site.

Swindon is one of the locations for an innovative scheme called Car share. It was set up as a joint venture between Wiltshire County Council and a private organisation and now has over 300,000 members registered. It is a car pool or ride-sharing rather than a car share scheme, seeking to link people willing to share transport.

The town contains a large roundabout called Magic Roundabout. There are five mini-roundabouts within this roundabout and at its centre is a contra-rotational hub. It is the junction of five roads: (clockwise from South) Drove Road, Fleming Way, County Road, Shrivenham Road and Queens Drive. It is built on the site of Swindon wharf on the abandoned Wilts & Berks Canal, near the County Ground. The official name used to be County Islands, although it was colloquially known as the Magic Roundabout and the official name was changed to match its nickname.

On 8 October 2019, GWR posted a modern speed record when an Intercity Express Train took just 44 minutes to travel from Swindon to London Paddington.

National Cycle Network Route 45 runs through the town.

Tourism and recreation

Events

Annual events in Swindon include:
 The Swindon Festival of Literature, held over two weeks in May.
 The Swindon Mela, an all-day celebration of South Indian arts and culture in the Town Gardens, which attracts up to 10,000 visitors each year.
 The Children's Fete, a town-wide event in celebration of Swindon's children, community, culture, and heritage, is usually held the first Saturday in July in the GWR Park on Faringdon Road, with 8,000 attending in 2016.
 The Summer Breeze Festival has been held annually in the town since 2007 with headliners including Toploader and KT Tunstall. The family-friendly music event is run by volunteers on a non-profit basis with any funds raised going to charity.
 An annual Gay Pride Parade called Swindon And Wiltshire Pride is held in the town. The parade has been held in the Town Gardens since 2007. Swedish DJ Basshunter performed in the 2012 celebrations, with around 8,000 people attending.
 The Swindon Beer Festival, Organised by the local branch of the Campaign for Real Ale (CAMRA), is held at the STEAM museum in October each year. There is also an Old Town Beer Festival held in Christ Church.
Swindon Open Studios, held over two weekends every September local artists open their studios to visitors or take part in group exhibitions around the town. 
The Swindon Half Marathon is held in September.

Arts venues 
 Swindon's most recent addition is the Shoebox Theatre, a fringe theatre and producing house with a focus on contemporary performance and new work.
 Live music venues such as The High Street Club, The Kings Arms, The Castle, The Beehive, Level III, and The Victoria attract local acts as well as touring national acts. Collectively they host an annual music festival, the Swindon Shuffle. The Oasis Leisure Centre and the County Ground are used for some major events. MECA is a 2,000-capacity music venue in the former Mecca bingo hall.
 The Arts Centre is a theatre in Old Town which seats 200 and has music, professional and amateur theatre, comedians, films, children's events, and one-man shows.
 The Wyvern Theatre has film, comedy, and music.
 In 2012 Swindon: The Opera was performed at the STEAM Museum in Swindon by the Janice Thompson Performance Trust, after a successful 2011 Jubilee People's Millions Lottery bid. It charted Swindon's history since 1952 until the present day. Over twenty songs were written by Matt Fox, with music by internationally acclaimed composer Betty Roe MBE.

Shopping / plazas

Swindon Designer Outlet is an indoor shopping mall for reduced-price goods (mainly clothing), most of the buildings it uses were former railway works. The outlet is adjacent to the Steam Museum and the National Trust headquarters. It holds around 100 retailers and restaurants, and once held the record of biggest covered designer outlet centre in Europe. The outlet received a significant expansion in the mid-2010s, allowing it to hold more retailers and restaurants, as well as a visual upgrade.
The Brunel Centre and The Parade are the two shopping complexes in the town centre, built along the line of the filled-in Wilts and Berks Canal (where a canal milepost can still be seen). The Brunel Centre opened a food court called The Crossing in April 2018.
Greenbridge Retail and Leisure Park (Stratton St. Margaret), Orbital Shopping Park (Haydon Wick), and the West Swindon Shopping Centre / Shaw Ridge Leisure Park are the three major out-of-town facilities. There is also the Bridgemead Retail Park and Mannington Retail Park both located in West Swindon, in close proximity to each other. Outside of these, there are various minor retail parks.
Regent Circus opened in 2015 on the site of the former Swindon College building. It contains a Cineworld cinema, an upcoming Boom Battle Bar, and three restaurants: Nando's, Lamaya and Funky Grilla.
Former
 Swindon Tented Market, in the Town Centre close to the Brunel Centre, was built in 1994. It reopened in October 2009, having been closed for two years but closed again in August 2017.

Green spaces
Public parks include Lydiard Country Park, Shaw Forest Country Park, The Lawns, Stanton Park, Queens Park, GWR Park, Town Gardens, Pembroke Gardens and Coate Water. Fishing for the Moon is a smal urban sensory garden created in 1990 by Thamesdown Borough Council and renovated by South Swindon Parish Council in 2021. its central feature is an artwork by Michael Farrell.

Media

Online 
Swindon has many online media outlets with the largest being the Swindon Advertiser. SwindonWeb was the first website dedicated to Swindon in 1997 followed by SwindonLink and The Swindonian with many other sites now available, including Total Swindon.

Print

Newspapers and magazines 
Swindon has a daily newspaper, the Swindon Advertiser, with daily circulation of about 4,000 with an estimated readership of 21,000. Other newspapers covering the area include Bristol's daily Western Daily Press and the Swindon Advertisers weekly, the Gazette and Herald; the Wiltshire Ocelot (a free listings magazine), The Swindonian Monthly Magazine  Swindon Star, Hungry Monkeys (a comic), Stratton Outlook, Frequency (an arts and cultural magazine), Great Swindon Magazine, Swindon Business News, Swindon Link and Highworth Link.

Literature 
Swindon is the setting for the Thursday Next series of novels by Jasper Fforde and The Curious Incident of the Dog in the Night-Time by Mark Haddon.

Radio
The first commercial radio station launched in Swindon was Wiltshire Radio in 1982, with BBC Wiltshire Sound launched in 1989. Wiltshire Radio later changed to GWR FM, then to Heart Wiltshire, and is now Heart West, broadcasting from studios in Bristol. An alternative commercial radio station, Brunel FM, was launched in 2006 and replaced in turn by Total Star Swindon, More Radio, Jack FM and Sam FM; the frequency is now used by Greatest Hits Radio Swindon. Another independent station called Swindon FM was also on the air between 2001 and 2006.

Since 2008, the town has had its own 24-hour community radio station, Swindon 105.5, which was given the Queen's Award for Voluntary Service in 2014, the highest award which can be given to a voluntary group. In regards to the wider Wiltshire county, the public-sector station BBC Radio Wiltshire remains based in Swindon.

Television
The Swindon area is in the overlap between two transmission regions, the Thames Valley and the West of England. ITV regional news programmes come from ITV News Meridian (with offices at Abingdon) and ITV West Country (Bristol). On BBC One the area is served by both South Today (from Oxford) and Points West (Bristol).

Between 1973 and 1982, the town had its own cable television channel called Swindon Viewpoint. This was a community television project run mainly by enthusiasts from studios in Victoria Hill, and later by Media Arts at the Town Hall Studios. It was followed by the more commercial Swindon's Local Channel, which included pay-per-view films. NTL (later Virgin Media) took over the channel's parent company, ComTel, and closed the station.

Education
The borough of Swindon has many primary schools, 12 secondary schools, and two purpose-built sixth-form colleges. Three secondary schools also have sixth forms. There is one independent school, Maranatha Christian School at Sevenhampton.

Secondary schools
Abbey Park School ages 11 – 16
Commonweal School ages 11 – 18
The Deanery CE Academy ages 11-15
The Dorcan Academy ages 11 – 16
Great Western Academy ages 11 – 18
Highworth Warneford School ages 11 – 16
Kingsdown School ages 11 – 16
Lawn Manor Academy ages 11 – 16
Lydiard Park Academy ages 11 – 18
Nova Hreod Academy ages 11 – 16
The Ridgeway School and Sixth Form College ages 11 – 18
St Joseph's Catholic College ages 11 – 16
Swindon Academy ages 3 – 18
UTC Swindon ages 14 – 18

Further education
New College and Swindon College cater for the town's further education and higher education requirements, mainly for 16- to 21-year-olds. Swindon College is one of the largest FE-HE colleges in southwestern England, situated at a purpose-built campus in North Star, Swindon.

Higher education
Swindon is the UK's largest centre of population without its own university (by comparison, there are two universities in nearby Bath, which is half Swindon's size). In March 2008, a proposal was made by former Swindon MP, Anne Snelgrove, for a university-level institution to be established in the town within a decade, culminating in a future 'University of Swindon' (with some touting the future institution to be entitled 'The Murray John University, Swindon', after the town's most distinguished post-war civic leader). In October 2008, plans were announced for a possible University of Swindon campus to be built in east Swindon to the south of the town's Great Western Hospital, close to the M4-A419 interchange. However, these plans are currently mothballed.

Oxford Brookes University has had a campus in Swindon since 1999. The campus offers degrees in Adult Nursing and Operating Department Practice (ODP). The Joel Joffe Building opened in August 2016 and was officially opened in February 2017 by Lord Joel Joffe, a long-time Swindon resident and former human rights lawyer. From 1999 to 2016 the Ferndale Campus was based in north-central Swindon. The university also sponsors UTC Swindon, which opened in 2014 for students aged 14–19.

Between 2000 and 2008 the University of Bath had a campus in Walcot, east Swindon.

The Royal Agricultural University has its Cultural Heritage Institute in the former railway carriage works.

Museums and cultural institutions

 The Richard Jefferies Museum, near Coate Water Country Park, is dedicated to the memory of one of England's most individual writers on nature and the countryside.
 STEAM – Museum of the Great Western Railway is on part of the site of the former railway works.
 Lydiard House, at the centre of Lydiard Country Park, is a Palladian house with staterooms containing collections of furniture and art.
The Local Studies Collection at Swindon Central Library is an extensive local studies and family history archive.
 Swindon Arts Centre is a 212-seat entertainment venue in the Old Town.
 The Wyvern Theatre is the town's principal stage venue.
 Swindon Museum and Art Gallery has collections related to local history, archaeology and natural history as well as an important collection of modern British art and studio ceramics.
 The Museum of Computing was the first computer museum in the UK.
The Science Museum's National Collections Centre is nearby at Wroughton.
The Bodleian Library's Book Storage Facility is at South Marston on the edge of Swindon.

Sport

Football
Swindon Town F.C. are based at the County Ground near the town centre. They play in League Two, the fourth-highest tier of the English football league system, after being relegated from League One in 2021. The affiliated women's club, Swindon Town W.F.C., play in Division One South West of the FA Women's National League; their first team play home games outside the town at Fairford Town's Cinder Lane ground.

The town also has a non-league club, Swindon Supermarine F.C., playing in the Premier South division of the Southern League at their South Marston ground. New College Swindon run a football academy for both sexes, usually alongside academic courses; until the summer of 2020 they fielded New College Swindon F.C., which played in Division One of the Hellenic League and was based at Supermarine's ground.

Rugby
Swindon has two rugby union teams, Swindon Rugby Football Club and Supermarine Rugby Football Club.

Swindon St George are a rugby league team playing in the West of England Rugby League. The kit consists of black and red shirts with black shorts and socks. It was founded in 2007.

English Rugby player Jonny May lived in Chiseldon and attended The Ridgeway School & Sixth Form College located in Wroughton, both nearby villages to Swindon.

Ice hockey

The Swindon Wildcats play in the second-tier English Premier Ice Hockey League. Since their inception in 1986, the Wildcats have played their home games at the 2,800-capacity Link Centre in West Swindon.

Motor sports
Swindon Robins is a speedway team competing in the top national division, the SGB Premiership, where they were champions in the 2017 season. The team has operated at the Abbey Stadium, Blunsdon since 1949. There was a speedway track in the Gorse Hill area of Swindon in the early days of the sport in the late 1920s and early 1930s.

Athletics 
Swindon has two athletics clubs affiliated to England Athletics, Swindon Harriers (running, track and field) and Swindon Striders (running). There is also a group called Swindon Shin Splints. Two Hash House Harrier runnung groups are centred on Swindon, North Wilts Hash House Harriers (who run every Sunday) and the Moonrakers Hash House Harriers (who run every other Wednesday evening). There is a parkrun held every Saturday at Lydiard Country Park.

Climbing 
Swindon Mountaineering Club is affiliated to the British Mountaineering Council and organise meets for walking, rock climbing and mountaineering in the UK and abroad. Members train on an indoor climbing wall at the Rockstar Climbing Centre in Swindon.

Notable residents

Dean Ashton, former England international footballer
Julian Clary, stand-up comedian who lived in Rodbourne
Rick Davies, vocalist and keyboardist from the rock band Supertramp.
Diana Dors, actor
Justin Hayward, lead singer and guitarist in the band The Moody Blues.
Nick Hewer, businessman and TV presenter
Mark Lamarr, comedian, TV presenter and radio host
Electronic music group Meat Beat Manifesto was originally formed in 1987 in Swindon.
Melinda Messenger, TV presenter and former glamour model
Rachel Shelley, actor
Gilbert O'Sullivan, Irish-born singer-songwriter who grew up in Swindon
Billie Piper, actor
Jon Richardson, stand-up comedian who used to live in the town
Ben Thatcher, former Premier League footballer who played internationally for Wales
Post-punk band XTC was formed in Swindon in 1972. Three of the band's singles reached the UK top 20, gaining them a cult following.

Twin towns
 Salzgitter, Germany
 Ocotal, Nicaragua
 Toruń, Poland
 Disney World, United States

See also
History of Swindon
History of local government in Swindon
List of people from Swindon
List of schools in Swindon
Transport in Swindon
Swindon Civic Trust
Economy of Wiltshire
Healthcare in Wiltshire

References

Further reading
 Swindon in 50 Buildings, Angela Atkinson, Amberley Publishing, 2019, paperback, 96 pages,  (print),  (ebook)   
 Secret Swindon, Angela Atkinson, Amberley Publishing, 2018, paperback, 96 pages,    
Swindon, Mark Child, Breedon Books, 2002, hardcover, 159 pages, 
 Francis Frith's Swindon Living Memories (Photographic Memories S.), Francis Frith and Brian Bridgeman, The Frith Book Company Ltd, 2003, Paperback, 96 pages, 
 An Awkward Size for a Town, Kenneth Hudson, 1967, David & Charles Publishers (no ISBN)

External links

 
 
 SwindonWeb

 
Towns in Wiltshire
Borough of Swindon
Railway towns in England
Polish communities